Stade Sidi Bernoussi is a multi-use stadium in the Sidi Bernoussi district of Casablanca, Morocco. It is currently used mostly for football matches. The stadium has a capacity of 10,000 people.

The stadium is home of Rachad Bernoussi football team.

References 

Football venues in Morocco
Sports venues in Casablanca